The Galaxy series is a family of communications satellites originally developed and operated by Hughes Communications. It has since merged with PanAmSat and is now owned and operated by Intelsat. As one of the earliest geostationary satellites, Galaxy 1 was launched on 28 June 1983. The latest two, Galaxy 35 and 36, were launched together on 13 December 2022.

References

External sources 
 Program: Galaxy. Objective: Communications. Overview: Television broadcast satellite at archive.org

Communications satellite constellations